Hans Raj Dogra (died August 1999) was an Indian politician and member of the Indian National Congress . Dogra was a member of the Jammu and Kashmir Legislative Assembly from Doda constituency in 1972.

References 

People from Jammu
Dogra people
Bharatiya Janata Party politicians from Jammu and Kashmir
Jammu & Kashmir National Conference politicians
Jammu and Kashmir MLAs 1996–2002
1931 births
2005 deaths